Hospitales Station is a station and terminus on Line H of the Buenos Aires Underground. Here passengers may transfer to Metrobus Sur. It was opened on 27 May 2013 as a one-station extension from Parque Patricios. It is currently serving as the southern terminus of the line, until it is extended to Sáenz.

References

External links

Buenos Aires Underground stations
Railway stations opened in 2013
2013 establishments in Argentina